Harateen (Harrateen) was woolen stuff of the 18th and early 19th-century produced in England. It was a furnishing material with a pattern used in Upholstery.

Fabrication 
Harateen was a plain weave fabric manufactured with coarser weft than the warp yarns. Then undergoes a procedure of watering and stamping. The two layers of cloth were pressed together with a hot press. Imprinted, thicker horizontal strands produce a distinct wavy pattern.

Use 
This fabric was used for curtains and bed hangings.

References 

Woven fabrics